Escape from Devil's Island is a 1935 American adventure film directed by Albert S. Rogell and written by Earle Snell and Fred Niblo Jr. The film stars Victor Jory, Florence Rice, Norman Foster, Stanley Andrews, Daniel L. Haynes and Herbert Heywood. The film was released on November 24, 1935, by Columbia Pictures.

Plot

Cast           
Victor Jory as Dario
Florence Rice as Johanna Harrington
Norman Foster as Andre Dion
Stanley Andrews as Steve Harrington
Daniel L. Haynes as Djikki 
Herbert Heywood as Bouillon
Frank Lackteen as Python
Arthur Aylesworth as Commondante
Noble Johnson as Bisco

References

External links
 

1935 films
1930s English-language films
American adventure films
1935 adventure films
Columbia Pictures films
Films directed by Albert S. Rogell
American black-and-white films
1930s American films